Grays Lake National Wildlife Refuge is a National Wildlife Refuge of the United States located in southeastern Idaho. It has the largest hardstem bulrush marsh in North America. Located in a high mountain valley near Soda Springs, the refuge and surrounding mountains offer scenic vistas, wildflowers, and fall foliage displays. Lands adjacent to the  refuge are primarily wet meadows and grasslands. The refuge provides breeding habitat for species of mammals including moose, elk, mule deer, muskrat, badger, and weasel.

Geography
The refuge has a surface area of 20,125.08 acres (81.44 km2 or 8,144 ha).

Bird habitat
The refuge hosts a large nesting population of greater sandhill cranes; as many as 1200 individuals are counted in the valley during migration and staging times. The refuge is a birding destination, and a good area to view the rare trumpeter swans. This near-pristine montane wetland is being threatened by the same type of suburban/rural development that has so heavily impacted nearby Jackson Hole.

References
Profile of Grays Lake National Wildlife Refuge
Refuge website

National Wildlife Refuges in Idaho
Protected areas of Bonneville County, Idaho
Protected areas of Caribou County, Idaho
Wetlands of Idaho
Landforms of Bonneville County, Idaho
Landforms of Caribou County, Idaho